The 1938 World Fencing Championships were held in Piešťany, Czechoslovakia.

Medal table

Medal summary

Men's events

Women's events

References

World Fencing Championships, 1938
1938 in fencing
F
Piešťany District
Sport in Trnava Region
World Fencing Championships
Fencing in Czechoslovakia